Ireland toured New Zealand and Australia in June 2010, playing a Test match against the All Blacks and the Wallabies. They also played the New Zealand Māori in Rotorua.

Touring squad
Ireland named a 34-man squad for their tour to New Zealand and Australia in June 2010. Rory Best and Paul O'Connell were both ruled out due to injury and replaced by John Fogarty and Ed O'Donoghue. Kevin McLaughlin was also ruled out and was replaced by Niall Ronan. Keith Earls had to pull out of the squad and was replaced by Gavin Duffy. Fergus McFadden was ruled out of the tour and was replaced by Johne Murphy. Damien Varley was called up to the squad as cover for Jerry Flannery.

 Caps updated before tour.

Coaching and management

Matches

See also
 History of rugby union matches between Ireland and Australia
 History of rugby union matches between Ireland and New Zealand

References

2010
2010
2010 in Australian rugby union
2010 in New Zealand rugby union
tour
2010 rugby union tours